The Legal Wife is a 2014 Philippine drama television series directed by Rory B. Quintos and Dado C. Lumibao, starring Angel Locsin, Jericho Rosales, Maja Salvador and JC de Vera. The series aired on ABS-CBN's Primetime Bida evening block and worldwide on The Filipino Channel from January 27, 2014 to June 13, 2014, replacing Maria Mercedes.

Plot
The story follows the lives of two best friends, Monica Santiago (Angel Locsin) and Nicole Esquivel (Maja Salvador). Friends from childhood, both yearn for a father’s love.

Monica’s mother Eloisa (Rio Locsin) escapes a controlling, jealous and violent husband but is only able to take her baby daughter. Her two sons are left behind. They are saved from the streets by her childhood sweetheart Dante Ramos (Mark Gil) who brings them to Daet, Camarines Norte, a beautiful province in the northern region of the Philippines.  Dante raises Monica as if she were his child.  Meanwhile, Dante leaves his girlfriend Camille Esquivel for Eloisa, unaware that she is pregnant with Nicole.  All throughout her childhood, Nicole longs to meet her father.

When Monica turns 7, her mother returns to her husband as she longs to be reunited with her sons. Monica is bewildered by a whole new environment with her wealthy father Javier (Christopher de Leon), and her two brothers Javi (Joem Bascon) and Jasper (Ahron Villena).

When Camille passes away, Nicole is adopted by her landed industrialist and wealthy grandfather, Don Eduardo Esquievel. The two little girls meet during an inter scholastic intramurals. They learn that they share the same “father” and lose him due to unforeseen circumstances in their lives. They become fast friends and bond like orphaned sisters, remaining close throughout their adult lives.

Upon returning to her true family, Monica learns to love her real father and her two brothers. Her Papa, Don Joaquin loves Eloisa, forgives his wife and is kinder to her. Eloisa reciprocates wholeheartedly and learns to love and care for Joaquin. Her feelings for Dante fades away.

Despite their painful past, the Santiago family thrives. Don Joaquin is a wealthy sardines magnate.  Unfortunately, Eloisa’s past mistakes is traumatic for the two older children she left behind years ago, deeply wounding the family’s psyche, particularly her eldest son Javie who rejects his relationship with his mother and his sister Monica.

Nicole suffers a similar trauma growing up without her father, severely affecting her attitude towards men, constantly seeking love and validation from the wrong men. The two best friends’ relationship collide when they love the same man.

Monica meets and falls in love with Adrian (Jericho Rosales), the man she marries, who teaches her how to love again and who will also break her heart.

Despite being madly in love with his wife, the pressures brought about on their lives, arising from the dynamics of their respective families’ dysfunctional relationships, Adrian is drawn to his wife’s best friend and embarks on an illicit affair with Nicole. Nicole is deeply enamored of her best friend’s husband who gives her the care and attention she seeks. She risks her life long friendship with Monica.

The discovery of the affair is explosive. The consequences of Adrian’s affair and deception, love and lust, is vividly portrayed in the entire series.

Cast and characters

Main cast

 Angel Locsin as Monica "Ikay" Santiago-de Villa
 Jericho Rosales as Adrian de Villa
 Maja Salvador as Nicole Esquivel
 JC de Vera as Max Gonzales

Supporting cast
 Christopher de Leon as Javier Santiago, Sr.
 Rio Locsin as Eloisa Santiago
 Mark Gil† as Dante Ramos
 Maria Isabel Lopez as Sandra de Villa
 Joem Bascon as Javier "Javi" Santiago. Jr.
 Ahron Villena as Jasper Santiago
 Janus del Prado as Bradley
 Matet de Leon as Rowena
 Gabriel Sumalde as “Bunjoy” S. de Villa (age 5)
 Louise Abuel as “Bunjoy” S. de Villa (age 10)

Extended cast
 Bernard Palanca as Miguel Zapanta
 Joe Vargas as Andrew de Villa
 Pamu Pamorada as Trish de Villa
 Leo Rialp as Eduardo "Gramps" Esquivel+
 Pinky Marquez as Emma Alvaro
 Michael Flores as Bob Rivera
 Thou Reyes as Jon
 Dionne Monsanto as Rhea
 Zeppi Borromeo as Anton
 Carla Humphries as Audrey
 Frenchie Dy as Kelly
 Sonjia Calit as Gwen

Guest cast
 Bugoy Cariño as young Jasper
 Casey De Silvia as young Nicole
 Xyriel Manabat as young Monica
 Aaron Junatas as young Javi
 James Blanco as young Javier
 Neri Naig as young Eloisa
 Matt Evans as young Dante
 Dang Cruz as young Yaya Krising
 Junjun Nayra as Atty. Hector Vargas
 Ricardo Cepeda as Manuel Gonzales

Production
Prior to the official airing of the show, its working titles were originally known as Hanggang Kailan Kita Mamahalin, and as Langis at Tubig. Jake Cuenca and Andi Eigenmann was originally part of the main cast, but was replaced by JC de Vera and Maja Salvador. Cuenca left to join Ikaw Lamang. Paulo Avelino was also reported to be part of the series but later backed out due to personal reasons (and to join Honesto & Bridges of Love). Avelino was later replaced by Jericho Rosales.

Filming of the series began in October 2013.

Scheduling
The Legal Wife was originally planned to air on October 28, 2013. It was later pushed back to November 2013 and was set to replace Bukas Na Lang Kita Mamahalin. But due to the request of Koreanovela fans and taping conflicts because of Typhoon Haiyan (Yolanda), the airing was postponed because of Korean drama When a Man Falls in Love. Eventually, the series had its pilot episode broadcast last January 27, 2014 as part of ABS-CBN's Primetime Bida block. Initially, the series was supposed to replace When a Man Falls in Love, but later ends up taking over the timeslot vacated by Maria Mercedes due to the demanding request of Koreanovela fans.

Reception

Critical reception
Prior to the official airing of the television series, ABS-CBN launched several teasers of the show. One was the slapping scene between Angel Locsin and Maja Salvador's characters aired on January 1, 2014. The trailer was well received and went even viral all over the web, creating parodies and memes.

Since the first episode, the show became a hot topic online and even trended on Twitter worldwide.

Television ratings
Basing on the data gathered by Kantar Media, the pilot episode earned 21.1% of national viewership, making it the 5th most watched primetime program. It is the first drama on Philippine television to win in its late primetime slot in the ratings in all of its episodes. The finale of The Legal Wife scored its biggest nationwide rating of 36.2%. This currently stands as the country's highest rating by any TV show on late primetime since the Philippines switched to nationwide TV ratings system in 2009.

Theme song
The theme song Hanggang Kailan Kita Mamahalin? was originally performed by Sharon Cuneta and served as the theme song for the 1996 film Madrasta, which also starred Cuneta alongside Zsa Zsa Padilla and Christopher de Leon. The film was produced by Star Cinema. It was covered by Angeline Quinto and it was used as the theme song for the TV series.

Reruns
Reruns of the show's episodes airs on Jeepney TV.

On March 18, 2020, ABS-CBN announced that the show would be rerun beginning March 23, 2020 via the network's Kapamilya Gold afternoon block, taking over the timeslot of Love Thy Woman as part of ABS-CBN's temporary programming changes due to the lockdown caused by the COVID-19 pandemic in the Philippines. This rerun was originally supposed to end on May 15, 2020.

However, it was abruptly cut due to the closure of ABS-CBN's free-to-air stations following the cease and desist order issued by the National Telecommunications Commission on account of its franchise expiration.

See also
 List of programs broadcast by ABS-CBN
 List of ABS-CBN drama series
List of programs broadcast by Jeepney TV

References

External links
 

ABS-CBN drama series
2014 Philippine television series debuts
2014 Philippine television series endings
Philippine romance television series
Philippine melodrama television series
Philippine thriller television series
Television series by Star Creatives
Filipino-language television shows
Television shows set in the Philippines